Ameer Shaker Aneed (born 8 October 1989) is an Iraqi athlete specialising in the sprint hurdles. He competed at the 2014 World Indoor Championships. In addition, he won a shared gold medal at the 2013 Islamic Solidarity Games.

His personal bests are 13.80 seconds in the 110 metres hurdles (+0.8 m/s, Sundsvall 2013) and 7.77 seconds in the 60 metres hurdles (Malmö 2016).

International competitions

1Did not start in the final
2Did not finish in the final

References

1989 births
Living people
Iraqi male hurdlers
Athletes (track and field) at the 2014 Asian Games
Asian Games competitors for Iraq
Swedish people of Iraqi descent
Hammarby IF Friidrott athletes